The 2021–22 Iraqi Premier League was the 48th season of the Iraqi Premier League, the highest tier football league in Iraq, since its establishment in 1974. The season started on 20 September 2021 and ended on 3 July 2022, with the relegation play-off held on 10 September 2022.

Al-Shorta secured the title with seven rounds of the league remaining, setting a new record for the earliest title win in Iraq and finishing a record 21 points clear at the top of the table. Al-Shorta also became the first club to beat all other teams in a 20-team season and the first club to win all Baghdad derbies home and away in one season.

Al-Shorta forward Mahmoud Al-Mawas from Syria became the first non-Iraqi player to win the league's top scorer award, scoring 22 goals, and the club's Egyptian manager Moamen Soliman became the first manager from Africa to win the Iraqi Premier League.

Teams

Clubs and locations

League table

Results

Relegation play-off

Duhok are promoted to the Iraqi Premier League, while Amanat Baghdad are relegated to the Iraq Division One.

Season statistics

Top scorers

Hat-tricks 

Notes
(H) – Home team

Awards

Number of teams by region

References

External links 
Official website 
Iraq Football Association

Iraqi Premier League seasons
1
Iraq